This is a List of emeralds by size.

Emeralds
Emerald is a gemstone and a variety of the mineral beryl (Be3Al2(SiO3)6) colored green by trace amounts of chromium and sometimes vanadium.  Beryl has a hardness of 7.5–8 on the Mohs scale.  Most emeralds are highly included, so their toughness (resistance to breakage) is classified as generally poor. Emerald is a cyclosilicate.

Emeralds in antiquity were mined in Egypt at locations on Mount Smaragdus since 1500 BCE, and India, and Austria since at least the 14th century CE. The Egyptian mines were exploited on an industrial scale by the Roman and Byzantine Empires, and later by Islamic conquerors. Mining ceased with the discovery of the Colombian deposits; only ruins remain.

Colombia is historically an important producer of emeralds, constituting 50–95% of the world production, with the number depending on the year, source and grade. Emerald production in Colombia has increased drastically in the last decade, increasing by 78% from 2000 to 2010. The three main emerald mining areas in Colombia are Muzo, Coscuez, and Chivor. Rare "trapiche" emeralds are found in Colombia, distinguished by ray-like spokes of dark impurities.

Zambia is the world's second biggest producer, with Kagem mine being the world's largest emerald mine responsible for 25-30% of the world's production of gem-quality stones. In 2019 Kagem emerald mine produced 42.4 million carats of emeralds. The Zambian emerald sector is an important contributor of tax revenue to the Government.

Zambian emeralds were formed over 500 million years ago, they are geologically much older than emeralds from other origins. As a result, they differ in their formation, composition and key features. Zambian emeralds get their intense green colour from the presence of chromium, iron and beryllium, and they are often lacking in vanadium, resulting in a bluish-green, lively and often eye-clean emerald.

Notable emeralds

See also
List of gold nuggets by size
List of sapphires by size
List of individual gemstones

Bibliography 
Notes

References 
 

 - Total pages: 240

 - Total pages: 352
 
 

 

Emeralds
Emeralds